Albert DeGroot Martin (1847 – March 17, 1915), was a professional baseball player who played second base and outfield  for the 1872 Brooklyn Eckfords and the 1874-1875 Brooklyn Atlantics. He was  also known as Albert May. 

He was later a bookkeeper. He married Emily Augusta Peverelly on May 26, 1873 at the South Dutch Church in Brooklyn.

He died at his home in Brooklyn, 76 Van Buren Street, in 1915.

References

External links

Major League Baseball second basemen
Morrisania Unions players
Brooklyn Eckfords players
Brooklyn Atlantics players
19th-century baseball players
1847 births
Date of birth missing
1915 deaths
Baseball players from New York (state)
American people of Dutch descent
Burials at Holy Cross Cemetery, Brooklyn